SOX is a discontinued UNIX clone.  It was developed from scratch in Brazil, in the late 1980s, by Computadores e Sistemas Brasileiros S/A (now Cobra Tecnologia), under the leadership of Ivan da Costa Marques.  Certified as UNIX-compatible by X/Open (through UniSoft) in early 1989, SOX was one of the first re-implementations of UNIX, fully independent of AT&T, that passed the X/Open verification tests, and the only one ever completed entirely outside the United States.

SOX was designed to run on COBRA's own minicomputers and was the result of the Brazilian Informatics Policy, which aimed to achieve technological independence from the United States.  Despite being a technical success, SOX came too late, when COBRA had largely lost its support.  SOX development stopped soon after it was certified, when the government decided to allow use of UNIX System V Release 4.0.

See also
COSIX
History of Unix
SISNE plus

References
 Peter Evans (1995) Embedded Autonomy: States and Industrial Transformation, Princeton, NJ: Princeton University Press
 Gustavo Gindre Monteiro Soares (2002) "A Politica dos Artifatos na Lei de Informática: o Caso SOX", XXV Congresso Brasileiro de Ciência de Comunicação, Salvador, Bahia.
 Luis Ferreira (aka Luix). Proposta de uma Arquitetura para um Sistema Operacional de Tempo Real. 1985. Dissertação (Mestrado em Engenharia de Sistemas e Computação) - Universidade Federal do Rio de Janeiro, Orientadores: Sueli Bandeira Teixeira Mendes and Firmo Freire.
 Márcia de Oliveira Cardoso. SOX: Um UNIX-compatível brasileiro a serviço do discurso de autonomia tecnológica. 2013. Tese de Doutorado apresentada ao Programa de Pós-Graduação História das Ciências e das Técnicas e Epistemologia, Universidade Federal do Rio de Janeiro, Orientador: José Carlos de Oliveira. http://sox-4s.pbworks.com/w/page/7219509/FrontPage

Information technology in Brazil
Unix variants